U.S. Girls is a Toronto-based experimental pop project formed in 2007, consisting solely of American musician and record producer Meghan Remy. She had released music on a variety of independent record labels before signing to 4AD in 2015.

Half Free, her first record for 4AD, was released the same year. It garnered a Juno Award nomination for Alternative Album of the Year at the Juno Awards of 2016, and was a shortlisted finalist for the 2016 Polaris Music Prize. Her next records In a Poem Unlimited (2018) and Heavy Light (2020) also received the same accolades.

Remy collaborates with a number of Toronto-based musicians on both songwriting and music production.

Background 
Remy grew up in Illinois and attended a Catholic high school. She was raised mostly by her mother. She was in her first punk band as a teenager. She cites riot grrrl and Crass as some of her early influences.

She attended an art college in Oregon, concentrating on paper arts and graphic design.

The name "U.S. Girls" originated from a casual conversation she was having with a friend talking about a European band coming to town. She joked, "Wait 'til they get a look at these U.S. girls!" and the phrase stuck.

Music career 
Remy began making music in the mid-2000s, playing in bands in Chicago and Portland. In 2008 she started recording solo at home.

After signing to 4AD in 2015, first album Half Free received critical acclaim from publications including The Quietus. She performed the album at festivals through 2016, including Primavera Sound.

In 2018, Remy's sixth studio album, In a Poem Unlimited, was released on 4AD. and was awarded Pitchfork's Best New Music accolade. She made her Coachella debut in 2019 as part of the album cycle.

2020's Heavy Light was released shortly before the pandemic, preceded by singles "4 American Dollars" and "Overtime".

Writing career 
In 2021, Remy released her first book, Begin by Telling, published by Bookhug Press. CBC.ca wrote that " experimental pop sensation Meg Remy spins a web out from her body to myriad corners of American hyper-culture. Through illustrated lyric essays depicting memories from early childhood to present day, Remy paints a stark portrait of a spectacle-driven country.".

Personal life 
Remy later moved the band to Toronto from Chicago in 2010 after marrying Canadian musician Max "Slim Twig" Turnbull. Alongside Turnbull, she operates record label Calico Corp., and sometimes performs as a guest vocalist with Turnbull's Badge Époque Ensemble.

She is a permanent resident of Canada.

Discography
Studio albums
Introducing... (2008)
Go Grey (2010)
U.S. Girls on KRAAK (2011)
Gem (2012)
Half Free (2015)
In a Poem Unlimited (2018)
Heavy Light (2020)
 Bless This Mess (2023)

Split albums
U.S. Girls / Slim Twig (2011) (with Slim Twig)

EPs
Kankakee Memories (2008)
U.S. Girls/Dirty Beaches Split EP (2011)
Free Advice Column (2013)

Compilations
Early Works (2011)

Singles

References

External links

American indie pop groups
Canadian indie pop groups
Musical groups from Chicago
Musical groups from Toronto
Musical groups established in 2007
American emigrants to Canada
4AD artists
Siltbreeze Records artists